José María Giménez de Vargas (born 20 January 1995) is a Uruguayan professional footballer who plays as a central defender for La Liga club  Atlético Madrid and the Uruguay national team. Ele é considerado um dos melhores zagueiros do futebol mundial.

After starting out his professional career with Danubio FC, Giménez moved to Spain, signing for Atlético Madrid ahead of the 2013–14 season. A solid, powerful and fast moving defender, Giménez settled quickly with the club, winning four major titles with the latter, including the La Liga title in his debut season.

At international level, Giménez made his Uruguay debut in 2013, and has since represented the nation at three FIFA World Cups and four editions of the Copa América.

Club career

Danubio
Born in Toledo, Giménez made his professional debut for Danubio F.C. in the Uruguayan Primera División on 17 November 2012 (when the manager was Juan Ramón Carrasco) against River Plate in which he started and played the full 90 minutes as Danubio lost the match 2–0.

Atlético Madrid

On 25 April 2013, it was confirmed that Giménez had signed for €900,000 with Spanish side Atlético Madrid, and would join the club in the pre-season of the 2013–14 season. On 14 September, Giménez made his Atleti – and La Liga – debut, starting in a 4–2 home win over UD Almería.

Giménez scored his first goal for the club on 6 December 2014, opening a 2–0 win away to Elche CF to move Atlético into second place. He also scored a header against their biggest rival Real Madrid in Atlético's 2–0 win in the Copa del Rey in January 2015.

On 20 February 2019, Giménez scored the opener in 2-0 home win against Italian champions Juventus to give Atlético the advantage in the first leg of the Round of 16 fixture in the UEFA Champions League.

Ahead of the 2019–20 season, Giménez was made third captain of the team, behind Koke and Jan Oblak.

International career

Giménez participated for Uruguay at the 2013 FIFA U-20 World Cup as the team finished as runner-up to France.

He debuted for the Uruguay senior team in a 2014 FIFA World Cup qualifier against Colombia on 10 September 2013.

On 2 June 2014, Giménez was named in Uruguay's squad for the 2014 FIFA World Cup finals. The 19-year-old defender made his tournament debut against England in the team's second group match, deputising for the injured captain Diego Lugano in a 2–1 victory for La Celeste.
 He went on to start in the final group match – a 1–0 win over Italy – and the 2–0 round of 16 loss to Colombia.

Giménez scored his first international goal in a 1–0 friendly win against South Korea on 8 September 2014. In May 2015, he was named in Uruguay's squad for the 2015 Copa América by coach Óscar Tabárez. On 20 June, he scored Uruguay's goal in a 1–1 draw with Paraguay which saw both teams progress to the knockout stage.

In May 2018 he was named in Uruguay's provisional 26-man squad for the 2018 FIFA World Cup in Russia. On 15 June, with the score tied at 0–0, he scored the winning goal in the final minute of Uruguay's opening game of the World Cup against Egypt.

In March 2019, Tabárez included Giménez in the final 23-man Uruguay squad for the 2019 Copa América in Brazil. He headed the equaliser in the 2–2 group draw with Japan in Porto Alegre, and was the only Uruguayan in the Team of the Tournament despite a quarter-final exit.

Personal life
José is married to Regina Iafolla, who he had been dating since they were teenagers. They have two children together, Lautaro and Luciano.
 
On 22 September 2020, Giménez tested positive for the coronavirus.

Career statistics

Club

International
As of match played 2 December 2022

International goals
Scores and results list Uruguay's goal tally first.

Honours
Atlético Madrid
La Liga: 2013–14, 2020–21
Supercopa de España: 2014
UEFA Europa League: 2017–18
UEFA Super Cup: 2018
UEFA Champions League runner-up: 2013–14, 2015–16

Uruguay U20
FIFA U-20 World Cup runner-up: 2013
Individual
Copa América Team of the Tournament: 2019

Notes

References

External links

Profile at the Atlético Madrid website

1995 births
Living people
People from Canelones Department
Association football defenders
Uruguayan footballers
Uruguayan expatriate footballers
Uruguayan expatriate sportspeople in Spain
Uruguayan Primera División players
Danubio F.C. players
La Liga players
Atlético Madrid footballers
Expatriate footballers in Spain
Uruguay under-20 international footballers
Uruguay international footballers
2014 FIFA World Cup players
2015 Copa América players
Copa América Centenario players
2018 FIFA World Cup players
2019 Copa América players
2021 Copa América players
2022 FIFA World Cup players